Susan Levitt (born 1955) is a San Francisco astrologer and tarot card reader. 
Her publications include Taoist Astrology and The Complete Tarot Kit.

References

Taylor Markarian (16 December 2021). "Year of the Tiger / What 2022 Has in Store for You". Reader's Digest. https://www.rd.com/article/year-of-the-tiger 
Susan Levitt interviewed.

Politico 
Phelim Kine (27 January 2022) "Power, Passion, Creativity and Coups".  Politico. https://www.politico.com/newsletters/politico-china-watcher/2022/01/27/putins-ukraine-playbook-is-xis-taiwan-primer-00002608

External links
 

American women writers
Writers from California
Living people
1955 births
21st-century American women